Meiolania ("small roamer") is an extinct genus of meiolaniid stem-turtle native to Australasia from the Middle Miocene to Late Pleistocene and possibly Holocene. It is best known from fossils found on Lord Howe Island, though fossils are known from mainland Australia, New Caledonia, and possibly Vanuatu and Fiji.

Taxonomy 

The genus was erected in 1886 based on remains found on Lord Howe Island, which Richard Owen assigned to the two species M. platyceps and M. minor (now a synonym of the former). These were the first good meiolaniid remains, and were used to show that the first known remains of a related animal, a species from Queensland now known as Ninjemys oweni (which was assigned to Meiolania until 1992), did not belong to lizards as initially thought, but to turtles. Woodward sank Niolamia argentina into Meiolania, but this was not accepted by later authors.

The species of the genus may be summarized as

In New Caledonia, M. mackayi was described from Walpole Island in 1925. It was smaller and less robust than M. platyceps. Meiolania remains are also known from the Pindai Caves, Grande Terre, and from Tiga Island. M. brevicollis was described in 1992 from the mid-Miocene Camfield Beds of northern Australia, and differed from M. platyceps in having a flatter skull and other horn proportions.

A second undescribed species of Meiolania from mainland Australia is known from the Wyandotte Creek locality in Queensland, dated to the Late Pleistocene, consisting of three horn cores and a caudal vertebra, noted to be "unusually large" in size. This species is referred to as M. cf platyceps, as the remains are most similar to M. platyceps but are not diagnostic beyond genus level.

Holocene remains of turtles from Vanuatu found in Lapita culture middens were referred to Meiolania in 2010 as the new species ?M. damelipi. However, this has been disputed, with other authors stating that the remains appeared to be non-meiolaniiform, and no parietal horns, a distinctive characteristic of Meiolania, have been found at any locality in Vanuatu, despite being one of the most common finds on Walpole and Lord Howe. The long bone morphology agrees more closely with a tortoise identification, a group which has otherwise not been reported from the South Pacific or Australasia. Further remains, attributable to ?M. damelipi or a closely related form, have been found in various parts of the Fijian archipelago, including Viti Levu, Vanua Levu, and some smaller islands. ?M. damelipi is the yongest species assigned to Meiolania, with the youngest remains dating to around 1000 BCE.

Description
Meiolania had an unusually shaped skull that sported many knob-like and horn-like protrusions. Two large horns faced sideways, and would have prevented the animal fully withdrawing its head into its shell. The tail was protected by armored 'rings', and sported thorn-like spikes at the end. The body form of Meiolania may be viewed as having converged towards those of dinosaurian ankylosaurids and xenarthran glyptodonts.

There are two species of Meiolania known from the Australian continent: M. brevicollis and an unnamed species. The unnamed species could reach  in carapace length, making it the second-largest known terrestrial turtle or tortoise, surpassed only by Megalochelys atlas from Asia, which lived in the Pleistocene. Another insular species is known from Lord Howe Island, M. platyceps.

Behavior
Meiolania is thought to have fed on plants, and they and other meiolaniids have been generally assumed to be fully terrestrial, though acceptance of this is not universal. Fossil Meiolania eggs have been reported from Lord Howe, assigned to the oogenus Testudoolithus lordhowensis. The eggs are large and spherical, approximately 5.4 cm in diameter, and around 800 μm thick. Like the eggs of modern turtles, they are made of aragonite. The eggs were likely deposited within an excavated hole nest.

Extinction
It is thought that postglacial sea level rise may have contributed to the extinction of M. platyceps on Lord Howe Island, as the area of the current island is much smaller than that exposed during the Pleistocene. They were absent when the islands were first explored by Europeans, who were likely the first humans to discover the islands. The extinction of Meiolania in mainland Australia and in Melanesia has been postulated to be due to human activity.

Gallery

See also

 Biodiversity of New Caledonia
 Holocene extinction

References

Further reading

External links 

 Meiolania platyceps Owen (The Australian Museum; photo)

Paleogene reptiles of Australia
New Caledonia Holocene fauna
Pleistocene reptiles of Australia
Pliocene turtles
Miocene turtles
Meiolaniformes
Miocene first appearances
Holocene extinctions
Neogene reptiles of Australia
Quaternary reptiles of Australia
Prehistoric turtle genera
Taxa named by Richard Owen
Fossil taxa described in 1886
Turtles of Australia
Extinct turtles